Commit may refer to:

Computing

Databases 

 Commit (data management), a set of permanent changes in a database
 COMMIT (SQL), an SQL statement used to create such a changeset

Version control 

 Changeset, list of differences between two successive versions in a repository
 Commit (version control), the operation of committing such a changeset to the repository

Microsoft Windows 

 Commit charge, a concept in operating system-level memory management

Others 
 Commit (motion), a parliamentary motion
 Nicotine replacement therapy, by the trade name Commit
 Commit (card game), a 19th century American variant of the French card game, Comet

See also
 Commitment (disambiguation)